José Edmar Brito Miranda (3 January 1934 – 25 December 2021) was a Brazilian politician. A member of the Brazilian Democratic Movement, he served in the Legislative Assembly of Goiás from 1963 to 1971 and again from 1983 to 1991.

References

1934 births
2021 deaths
20th-century Brazilian politicians
Members of the Legislative Assembly of Goiás
Social Democratic Party (Brazil, 1945–65) politicians
Brazilian Democratic Movement politicians
People from Tocantins